Albert Wolters may refer to:

 Albert M. Wolters (born 1942), professor of religion
 Albert William Wolters (1893–1961), British psychologist